Jastrab is a surname which means "hawk" in Slovak. Notable people with the surname include:

 Marek Jastráb (born 1993), Slovak footballer
 Megan Jastrab (born 2002), American racing cyclist

See also
 

Slovak-language surnames